Big Zuu's Big Eats is a British comedy television series that premiered on 15 May 2020, on Dave. It stars rapper and grime artist Big Zuu, along with friends Tubsey and Hyder. In each episode they meet a celebrity and discuss memorable and favourite foods, following which the trio cook a meal for the celebrity.

Format

The first series was filmed in autumn 2019, and saw Zuu, Tubsey and Hyder cook for comedians on tour, travelling the country in a branded food truck. In each episode, Zuu met with the comedian at a performing venue, and the two discussed food likes and dislikes. From this, Zuu would create a four-course menu - an amuse-bouche, followed by a three-course meal consisting of a starter, main course, and dessert. Footage of Zuu, Tubsey and Hyder shopping for ingredients - frequently favouring local businesses over national chains - would follow, interspersed with clips from the comedian's live performance. In the food truck, Zuu would demonstrate how to make the dishes discussed, with assistance from Tubsey and Hyder. The amuse-bouche would be served to the comedian shortly before they performed on stage that evening, or during a break in the show. After their show, the comedian and Zuu would sit down together at the venue for the three-course meal. 

The final two episodes of the first series consisted of Christmas specials featuring multiple guests, from the worlds of music and comedy, with Christmas-themed menus. Due to the impact of the Coronavirus pandemic on performing arts, series two and three saw the trio meeting up with a wider range of celebrities in a variety of locations. The format of a conversation about food, followed by shopping for ingredients, the cooking and the eating of the meal remained, though the 'filler' activities would vary - for example, Harry Redknapp is seen teaching Zuu how to play golf.

Episodes

Critical response

The show received favourable reviews, and in the 2021 BAFTAs received a nomination for Best Feature. At the 2022 BAFTAs the show won the award for Best Feature and Big Zuu won the award for Best Entertainment Performance. At the Broadcast Awards, Big Zuu's Big Eats received the Gamechanger Programme of the Year in 2021 and the Best Popular Factual Programme award in 2023.

The widening of the format for series two, necessitated by the Coronavirus pandemic, was regarded as a positive move for the show. The publicity which followed the show's two BAFTA wins highlighted the refugee backgrounds of the three hosts, and was welcomed by the Refugee Council as a positive portrayal of refugees and their families. The show was compared positively to other well-established cookery shows and formats.

The Daily Telegraphs Anita Singh and The Observers Barbara Ellen both reviewed the third series four out of five stars.

References

External links
 
 
 

Episode list using the default LineColor
2020 British television series debuts
2020s British comedy television series
2020s British cooking television series
British cooking television shows
English-language television shows
Dave (TV channel) original programming